Etteln is a village in the municipality of Borchen, district of Paderborn in the German State of North Rhine-Westphalia. Etteln is situated near Atteln at the river Altenau.

References

Villages in North Rhine-Westphalia